Frantz Mathieu (born 23 December 1952) is a Haitian former professional footballer who played as a defender. He spent most of his career in the United States, notably with Chicago Sting. At international level, he made 15 appearances for the Haiti national team.

Club career
Mathieu spent the 1978–79 season in West Germany with FC St. Pauli, before spending time in the North American Soccer League and Major Indoor Soccer League, playing with the Chicago Sting, the Tampa Bay Rowdies, the Montreal Manic and the Baltimore Blast.

International career
Mathieu also represented the Haiti national team at international level, appearing in fifteen FIFA World Cup qualifying matches between 1976 and 1981.

Honors
Chicago Sting
 NASL, Soccer Bowl: 1981, 1984
 Runner-up NASL Indoor season: 1980–81

Individual
NASL All-Star First Team Selections: 1981
NASL All-Star Honorable Mentions: 1980

References

External links
 

1952 births
Living people
Haitian footballers
Association football defenders
Haiti international footballers
Baltimore Blast (1980–1992) players
Chicago Sting (MISL) players
Chicago Sting (NASL) players
FC St. Pauli players
2. Bundesliga players
Major Indoor Soccer League (1978–1992) players
Montreal Manic players
North American Soccer League (1968–1984) indoor players
North American Soccer League (1968–1984) players
Tampa Bay Rowdies (1975–1993) players
Haitian expatriate footballers
Haitian expatriate sportspeople in Germany
Expatriate footballers in Germany
Haitian expatriate sportspeople in the United States
Expatriate soccer players in the United States
Haitian expatriate sportspeople in Canada
Expatriate soccer players in Canada